The 2017 Clipsal 500 Adelaide was a motor racing event for Supercars that was held on the weekend of 3 to 5 March 2017. The event was run at the Adelaide Street Circuit in Adelaide, South Australia, and was the nineteenth running of the Adelaide 500. It was the first event of fourteen in the 2017 Supercars Championship and consisted of two races of 250 kilometres. It was to be the last time Clipsal would be title sponsor for the event, having been so since 2000.

Shane van Gisbergen won both 250 kilometres races.

Report

Background

The event reverted to the two-race format last used in 2013, with organisers citing the format's popularity as the reason for its reintroduction. The top ten shootout will also be re-introduced for qualifying for the Saturday race.

Practice

Race 1

Qualifying

Top 10 Shootout, Race 1

Race 1

Race 2

Qualifying

Top 10 Shootout, Race 2

Race 2

Notes:
 — Scott Pye received a two-place grid penalty for impeding Jason Bright during qualifying for Race 2.
 — Simona de Silvestro received a two-place grid penalty for impeding Nick Percat during qualifying for Race 2. However, due to the fact that the offending driver could only be moved down one grid spot, the remainder of the penalty will be served at the next championship round, the 2017 Tyrepower Tasmania SuperSprint.

Championship standings after the event
 After Race 2 of 26. Only the top five positions are included for both sets of standings.

Drivers' Championship standings

Teams' Championship standings

References

External links

Adelaide 500
Clipsal 500
Clipsal 500
2010s in Adelaide